Michael or Mike Banks may refer to:

 Michael A. Banks (born 1951), American science fiction writer and editor
 Mike Banks (musician), American techno producer
 Mike Banks (mountaineer) (1922–2013), British climber and mountaineer
 Mike Banks (American football) (born 1979), former American football tight end
 Michael Banks, one of the characters from Mary Poppins (book series) and adaptations